Elachista nipponicella is a moth of the family Elachistidae that is found in Japan.

The forewings of the males are greyish or grey-brownish, mottled with a paler colour and with white markings. Females have dark greyish or blackish forewings often mottled with whitish markings on the basal half. There are probably multiple generations per year.

The larvae feed on Agropyron ciliare, Festuca parvigluma, Setaria viridis and some unidentified grass species. They mine the leaves of their host plant. The mine extends from the base of the tip towards the base. It is generally a full-depth mine, varying from elongate to linear. The frass is found in the older part of the mine.
Pupation takes place outside of the mine under a dense silk web.

References

External links

Moths described in 2006
Endemic fauna of Japan
nipponicella
Moths of Japan